Scarborough Public Schools is a school district in the state of Maine, in Cumberland County, Maine.

Schools
Scarborough High School (Grades 9–12)
Scarborough Middle School (Grades 6–8)
Wentworth School (Grades 3–5)
Pleasant Hill Primary School (Grades K-2)
Blue Point Primary School (Grades K-2)
Eight Corners Primary School (Grades K-2)
Scarborough Adult Learning Center

References

External links
 

Education in Cumberland County, Maine
School districts in Maine
Scarborough, Maine